Borders of Love is a 2022 Czech-Polish erotic drama film directed by Tomasz Wiński. It premiered at Karlovy Vary International Film Festival on 4 July 2022. The film was announced as an erotic thriller about the boundaries of love and freedom. Hana Vagnerová and Matyáš Řezníček are cast in the main roles, Martin Hoffman and Eliška Křenková appear in supporting roles. The film will enter theatres on 3 November 2022.

Plot
Hana and Petr live a somewhat stereotypical life and their relationship lacks energy. Hana decides to share her sexual dreams and fantasies with Petr, but she soon moves from imagination to action. The search for limits of commitment and freedom in partner life begins to gain momentum after other men and women are drawn into erotic games.

Cast
Hana Vagnerová as Hana
 Matyáš Řezníček as Petr
 Eliška Křenková
 Martin Hofmann
 Lenka Krobotová
 Hynek Čermák
 Antonie Formanová
 Jiří Rendl

References

External links
 
 Borders of Love at CSFD.cz 

2022 films
2022 drama films
2020s Czech-language films
Czech erotic drama films
Czech thriller films
Polish erotic drama films
Polish thriller films